The United Arab Emirates women's national cricket team represents the United Arab Emirates in international women's cricket and is organised by the Emirates Cricket Board (ECB).

History
Its international debut was at the 2007 ACC Women's Tournament in Malaysia. It lost all three of its matches, and on debut against Bangladesh were bowled out for nine runs, in a match which took one hour to complete. The squad was said to consist of "mothers and daughters", and the captain, Natasha Cherriath, was 12 years old. The team's coach was Smitha Harikrishna who played One Day International (ODI) cricket for India, and another ex-India player, Pramila Bhatt, was involved in a pre-tournament training camp.

At the 2009 ACC Women's Twenty20 Championship, UAE won its first international match, defeating Oman by 49 runs. The team also defeated Kuwait, placing fourth in its six-team group, and defeated Iran in a play-off to finish 7th overall (out of 12 teams). At the 2011 ACC Women's Twenty20 Championship, it placed 9th out of 10 teams and won two matches. At the 2013 ACC Women's Championship in Thailand, the team failed to win a single game, placing 10th out of 11 teams (above Kuwait). UAE won both editions of the Gulf Cricket Council (GCC) Women's Twenty20 Championship held in Oman in 2014 and in Qatar in 2015.

In June 2016, two teams from Australia's Women's Big Bash League (WBBL), the Sydney Sixers and the Sydney Thunder, toured UAE for a training camp. They played a Twenty20 exhibition match at the Sheikh Zayed Cricket Stadium in Dubai, and were joined by three UAE national team players (Natasha Michael, Chaya Mughal, and Esha Oza) who filled in for injured players.

In April 2018, ICC granted full Women's Twenty20 International (WT20I) status to all its members. Therefore, all Twenty20 matches played between United Arab Emirates and another international side after 1 July 2018 will be a full WT20I.

UAE was named in the 2021 ICC Women's T20 World Cup Asia Qualifier regional group alongside seven other teams.

Tournament history

Women's Asia Cup
 2022: 6th

ICC Women's T20 World Cup Qualifier
 2018: 7th (DNQ)
 2022: 7th (DNQ)

ICC Women's World Twenty20 Asia Qualifier
 2017: 2nd (Qualified)
 2019: 3rd (DNQ)
 2021: 1st (Qualified)

Records
International Match Summary
 
Last updated 9 October 2022

Twenty20 International 

Highest team total: 253/1 v. Bahrain on 26 March 2022 at Oman Cricket Academy Ground Turf 2, Muscat.
Highest individual innings: 158*, Esha Oza v. Bahrain on 26 March 2022 at Oman Cricket Academy Ground Turf 2, Muscat.
Best innings bowling: 5/3, Chamani Seneviratne v. Kuwait on 19 February 2019 at Asian Institute of Technology Ground, Bangkok.

Most T20I runs for UAE Women

Most T20I wickets for UAE Women

T20I record versus other nations

Records complete to WT20I #1266. Last updated 7 October 2022.

Current squad

This lists all the players who were named in the most recent squad. Updated on 9 October 2022.

Uncapped players are listed in italics.

See also
 List of United Arab Emirates women Twenty20 International cricketers

References

Cricket in the United Arab Emirates
Cricket, women's
Women's national cricket teams
Women
Women's sport in the United Arab Emirates